Estádio das Amoreiras, also known as Campo das Amoreiras, was a multi-use stadium in Lisbon, Portugal. It was used mostly for football matches and hosted the home games of S.L. Benfica. Opened in 1925, the stadium was able to hold 20,000 spectators. It was demolished in 1940 to make way for a freeway. Benfica would then move to Estádio do Campo Grande.

External links
 S.L. Benfica profile 

Defunct football venues in Portugal
S.L. Benfica
Sports venues completed in 1925
Sports venues demolished in 1940